Landman may refer to:

 Landman (rank), a defunct naval rank
 Landman (oil worker), a person whose work is focused on mineral rights, to include oil (petroleum) and natural gas exploration, development and production
 Landman (surname)

See also
 Landmann
 Landsman
 Lanzmann